RTB Sukmaindera (Jawi: سوكمايندرا RTB ) (formerly known as RTB4 and RTB International, stylised as RTB SUKMAINDERA) is a 24-hour.       free-to-air television channel in Brunei owned by Radio Television Brunei (RTB), the country’s state broadcaster. The channel officially began broadcasting on 9 July 2002.

The channel shows Malay and English dramas, animated programmes, documentaries, movies and various other programmes, both local and international and simulcast news slots from sister channel RTB Perdana.

On 11 April 2017, RTB4 was renamed as RTB Sukmaindera as part of RTB’s rebranding project as well as broadcaster’s shift from analogue into digital broadcasting.

References

External links
 About RTB Sukmaindera at RTB official website

Television channels in Brunei
Television channels and stations established in 2006